Eerik Aps (born 22 October 1987) is an Estonian wrestler.

He was born in Tallinn.

He started wrestling in 1994. He placed 5th at 2017 European Wrestling Championships (men's Greco-Roman 85 kg). He is multiple-times Estonian champion during 2006-2018.

References

External links
 

Living people
1987 births
Estonian male sport wrestlers
Sportspeople from Tallinn
21st-century Estonian people